Disaster Plan are an indie rock band from Melbourne, Australia featuring Richard Moffat and Michael Ruff. Formed in 1997, they have released six albums, toured nationally and been on rotation on Triple J.

Discography
 Assembly Area #1 (1996)
 Evacuation Centre (1998)
 Recording: November 1999 (1999)
 Disaster Plan Party (1999)
 Party LP (2001) - Sensory Projects
 Self Help Guide (2002) - Sensory Projects
 Reality Correctors One Through Twelve LP (2004)

References 

Victoria (Australia) musical groups
Low Transit Industries artists